There were 14 rowing events at the 2010 South American Games: 6 women's events and 8 men's events. The events were held over March 20–22.

Medal summary

Medal table

Medalists

 
2010 South American Games
South American Games
2010
Rowing competitions in Argentina